In homological algebra, the hyperhomology or hypercohomology is a generalization of (co)homology functors which takes as input not objects in an abelian category  but instead chain complexes of objects, so objects in . It is a sort of cross between the derived functor cohomology of an object and the homology of a chain complex since hypercohomology corresponds to the derived global sections functor .  

Hyperhomology is no longer used much: since about 1970 it has been largely replaced by the roughly equivalent concept of a derived functor between derived categories.

Motivation 
One of the motivations for hypercohomology comes from the fact that there isn't an obvious generalization of cohomological long exact sequences associated to short exact sequencesi.e. there is an associated long exact sequenceIt turns out hypercohomology gives techniques for constructing a similar cohomological associated long exact sequence from an arbitrary long exact sequencesince its inputs are given by chain complexes instead of just objects from an abelian category. We can turn this chain complex into a distinguished triangle (using the language of triangulated categories on a derived category)which we denote byThen, taking derived global sections  gives a long exact sequence, which is a long exact sequence of hypercohomology groups.

Definition
We give the definition for hypercohomology as this is more common. As usual, hypercohomology and hyperhomology are essentially the same: one converts from one to the other by dualizing, i.e. by changing the direction of all arrows, replacing injective objects with projective ones, and so on. 

Suppose that A is an abelian category with enough injectives and F a left exact functor to another abelian category B. 
If C is a complex of objects of A bounded on the left, the hypercohomology 

Hi(C) 

of C (for an integer i) is
calculated as follows:
 Take a quasi-isomorphism Φ : C → I, here I is a complex of injective elements of A.
 The  hypercohomology Hi(C) of C is then the cohomology  Hi(F(I)) of the complex F(I).

The hypercohomology of C is independent of the choice of the quasi-isomorphism, up to unique isomorphisms. 

The hypercohomology can also be defined using derived categories: the hypercohomology of C is just the cohomology of RF(C) considered as an element of the derived category of B.

For complexes that vanish for negative indices, the hypercohomology can be defined as the derived functors of H0 = FH0 = H0F.

The hypercohomology spectral sequences

There are two  hypercohomology spectral sequences; one with  E2 term 

and the other  with  E1 term 

and E2 term 

 

both converging to the hypercohomology 

, 

where RjF is a right derived functor of F.

Applications 
One application of hypercohomology spectral sequences are in the study of gerbes. Recall that rank n vector bundles on a space  can be classified as the Cech-cohomology group . The main idea behind gerbes is to extend this idea cohomologically, so instead of taking  for some functor , we instead consider the cohomology group , so it classifies objects which are glued by objects in the original classifying group. A closely related subject which studies gerbes and hypercohomology is Deligne-cohomology.

Examples

See also
 Cartan–Eilenberg resolution
Gerbe

References
H. Cartan,   S. Eilenberg,   Homological algebra 

 A. Grothendieck,   Sur quelques points d'algèbre homologique Tohoku Math. J. 9  (1957)  pp. 119-221
Homological algebra